History of Man may refer to one of the following:

 Human history, the history of humanity
 History of the Isle of Man
 Scientology: A History of Man, a book by L. Ron Hubbard